A ninja was a secret agent or mercenary of feudal Japan specializing in unorthodox arts of war.

Ninja may also refer to:

People 
 Ninja (gamer), the alias of American professional gamer Richard Tyler Blevins
 Ninja, the alias of Watkin Tudor Jones, a South African rapper and member of hip hop group Die Antwoord
 Ninja (British rapper), a member of the band The Go! Team named Nkechi Ka Egenamba
 Bert Batawang, a boxer with the ring name The Ninja
 Murilo Rua, ring name Ninja, an MMA fighter
 Ninja Sarasalo, Finnish model and singer

Arts, entertainment, and media
 Ninja (1986 video game) (arcade title: Ninja Mission), a flip screen beat 'em up game developed by Sculptured Software and released by Mastertronic
 Ninja: Shadow of Darkness, a 1998 video game for the PlayStation
 Ninja (album), an album by Christina Aguilar
 Ninja (comic book), a 1983–98 Yugoslav novel/comic series
 Ninja (film), a 2009 film by Isaac Florentine
 Sega Ninja, a video game also known as The Ninja  or Ninja Princess
 The Ninja (novel), a 1980 novel by Eric Van Lustbader
 "Ninjas", a 2017 song by Rey Pila
 A number of television shows based on a Ninja Warrior concept:
Sasuke (TV series) (also shown as Ninja Warrior), a Japanese television show based around an obstacle course.
Kunoichi (TV series) (Women of Ninja Warrior), a TV show spun-off from Sasuke, featuring exclusively female competitors.
Sasuke Ninja Warrior Indonesia, an Indonesian adaptation of Sasuke's format.
American Ninja Warrior, an American variation of Sasuke that began as a qualifier to compete on Sasuke.
Team Ninja Warrior, a spin-off of American Ninja Warrior focused on team competition.
Ninja Warrior UK, a British adaptation of the Ninja Warrior format.
Australian Ninja Warrior, an Australian adaptation of the Ninja Warrior format.
 Ninja Warrior Germany, a German adaptation of the Ninja Warrior format.

Computing
 Ninja (build system), a small build system with a focus on speed by Google
 .ninja, a generic top-level domain
 Ninja-IDE, an Integrated development environment for Python applications

Groups, teams, organizations 
 Ninja (militia), a militia in the Republic of the Congo
 Ninjas in Pyjamas, Swedish professional video game esports team

Roller coasters 
 Ninja (Six Flags Magic Mountain), an inverted roller coaster at Six Flags Magic Mountain
 Ninja (Six Flags St. Louis), a roller coaster at Six Flags St. Louis
 Blue Hawk (roller coaster), formerly known as Ninja,  a roller coaster at Six Flags Over Georgia

Other uses
 Kawasaki Ninja, several series of Japanese sport bikes
 SharkNinja, makers of Ninja brand kitchen appliances
 NINJA loan, for "no income no job or asset", a term related to the US subprime mortgage crisis (see no income, no asset)
 Ninja miner, a Mongolian small-scale gold miner

See also 

 Kunoichi (disambiguation)
 List of ninja films
 Nina (name)
 Ninja in popular culture
 Ninja Warrior (disambiguation)
 Modern schools of ninjutsu
 Shinobi (disambiguation)